Darko Dunato (born 17 May 1960) is a former Croatian handball player.

Honours
Zamet
Croatian First A League: Vice-Champions (1): 1991–92
Yugoslav Second League (1): 1986–87

References

Yugoslav male handball players
Croatian male handball players
RK Zamet players
RK Zamet coaches
ŽRK Zamet coaches
Handball players from Rijeka
1960 births
Living people
Yugoslav expatriate sportspeople in Italy
Croatian handball coaches